Stéphane Franke (February 12, 1964 – June 23, 2011) was a long-distance runner representing Germany, who twice won the bronze medal in the men's 10.000 metres at the European Championships (1994 and 1998). He represented Germany twice at the Summer Olympics, in 1992 (Barcelona) and 1996 in Atlanta.

Having been born in Versailles, France, Franke also held French citizenship. At age five, he moved to Bergisch Gladbach with his family. Eventually they made their home in Filderstadt, near Stuttgart. Franke joined SV Salamander Kornwestheim from Kornwestheim, also near Stuttgart. In 1997, he moved to Berlin and became part of SC Charlottenburg Berlin.

He died in Potsdam, Germany, on June 23, 2011, of lymphatic cancer, within five weeks of being diagnosed with the disease, at the age of 47.

Achievements

References

1964 births
2011 deaths
German male long-distance runners
Athletes (track and field) at the 1992 Summer Olympics
Athletes (track and field) at the 1996 Summer Olympics
Olympic athletes of Germany
European Athletics Championships medalists
SV Salamander Kornwestheim athletes
20th-century German people